Issa E. Batarseh is a Professor in the Department of Electrical and Computer Engineering at the University of Central Florida.

Education and career
Batarseh got his Ph.D. in electrical engineering from the University of Illinois at Chicago in 1990 and prior to it, got his B.S. in computer engineering and M.S. in electrical engineering from the University of Illinois at Chicago in 1983 and 1985, respectively. Following graduation, from 1989 to 1990, Batarseh served as a visiting assistant professor at Purdue University in Calumet City, Illinois.  He was appointed to the University of Central Florida in 1991.

Awards and recognitions

 2008, elected fellow of American Association for the Advancement of Science,
 2014, became a fellow of the IEEE.  
 2015,elected a fellow of the National Academy of Inventors. 
 2017 inducted into Florida Inventors Hall of Fame in 2017.

Books

References

External links

20th-century births
Living people
American electrical engineers
University of Illinois Chicago alumni
University of Central Florida faculty
Fellow Members of the IEEE
Fellows of the American Association for the Advancement of Science
Year of birth missing (living people)